Taureau may refer to:

Taureau, a French warship involved in the Battle of Hampton Roads
Taureau (film), a Canadian drama film directed by Clément Perron
Taureau Reservoir